Jack Conan (born 29 July 1992) is an Irish rugby union player for Leinster Rugby and for Ireland.
His preferred position is number 8.

Leinster
Conan made his senior debut in February 2014 against the Cardiff Blues. Conan was dropped from the Leinster senior squad for the 2014/15 season, one year ahead of scheduled completion of the academy. Conan was named man-of-the-match for his performance against Ulster on 3 January 2015, in a game where he led all forwards with 40 meters gained and 8 defenders beaten.
On 13 January 2017, Conan scored a hat-trick in the 57-3 win against Montpellier in the European Rugby Champions Cup at the RDS. Conan gained his 100th Leinster cap in a Pro14 victory over Dragons on 19 February 2021. Conan scored the game's only try and was named Player of the Match in Leinster's 16–6 victory over Munster in the 2021 Pro14 Grand Final.

Ireland
Conan was one of only two uncapped players included in the extended Ireland rugby squad for the 2015 Six Nations Championship, but he did not play in any of Ireland’s matches that tournament.
He debuted for Ireland in a victory against Scotland at Lansdowne Road in an August 2015 Rugby World Cup warm-up match where he started at flanker. He did not make Ireland’s 2015 World Cup squad, however, and did not play another match for Ireland for almost two years, until June 2017.

British & Irish Lions
Conan was named in the squad for the 2021 British & Irish Lions tour to South Africa. He started all three Lions' test matches against South Africa.

Honours

Leinster
European Rugby Champions Cup: 1 (2018)
Pro14: 4 (2018, 2019, 2020, 2021)

Ireland
Six Nations Championship:
Winner (2): 2018, 2023
Grand Slam:
Winner (2): 2018, [[2023 Six Nations Championship|2023]
Triple Crown:
Winner (3): 2018, 2022, 2023

References

External links

Leinster Profile
Pro14 Profile
Ireland Profile

Living people
1992 births
People educated at St Gerard's School, Bray
Rugby union players from County Wicklow
Irish rugby union players
Old Belvedere R.F.C. players
Leinster Rugby players
Ireland international rugby union players
Ireland Wolfhounds international rugby union players
Rugby union number eights
Rugby union flankers
British & Irish Lions rugby union players from Ireland